All telephone numbers in Panama are seven or eight digits long (xxx-xxxx or 6xxx-xxxx) and there are no area codes. All numbers that both begin with 6 and have 8 digits are mobile numbers. All landline numbers have 7 digits. The first digit of landline numbers may be used to vaguely identify the location of the caller. Mobile phones were also assigned 7 digit numbers until 2005, when they were moved to their own number space with 8 digits. Mobile numbers are recycled if the user is marked as inactive by the mobile service provider, and landline numbers are also recycled if a user cancels their landline phone service.

Land Lines
The following table lists the first digit for locations of land-lines:

Mobile Phones
6xxx xxxx

Emergency and Assistance Numbers
The following three-digit numbers are also in use:

See also 
 Telecommunications in Panama

Notes

References

External links
Autoridad Nacional de los Servicios Públicos – Panama’s telephone systems regulator.
GSM coverage in Panama GSM World / GSMA Mobile World Congress

Panama
Telecommunications in Panama